The Lord Provost's Rent Relief Cup comprised two separate football tournaments played in aid of the Lord Provost's Rent Relief Fund in 1921. Held in Edinburgh and Glasgow, both were one-off competitions. Various other tournaments and events were held to help the unemployed in 1921.

Glasgow 
The six member clubs (Celtic, Clyde, Queen's Park, Partick Thistle, Rangers, and Third Lanark) of both the Glasgow FA and the Scottish Football League competed in the Glasgow tournament. All six teams were used to playing against each other in city knockout competitions, with both the Glasgow Cup and Glasgow Charity Cup held on an annual basis. The tournament was completed in  a month.

Tournament 
First Round

Semi-finals

Final

Edinburgh 
The four member clubs (Heart of Midlothian, Hibernian, Leith Athletic, and St Bernard's) of both the Edinburgh FA and the Scottish Football League decided to compete in a one-off tournament. The final of the Edinburgh tournament was delayed by almost two years due to continuous postponements.

Tournament 
Semi-finals

Final

See also
 Glasgow Dental Hospital Cup

References

External links 
Lord Provost’s Rent Relief Fund Competitions, Scottish Football Historical Archive
Hutchison Cup (Lord Provost of Edinburgh Cup) SFAQ

Defunct football cup competitions in Scotland
Edinburgh football competitions
Football in Glasgow
Charity events in the United Kingdom
1921–22 in Scottish football
1922–23 in Scottish football